Sir Jamsetjee Jejeebhoy, 5th Baronet, KCSI, (6 March 1878 – 6 February 1931) was an Indian businessman.

Born Rustomjee Jejeebhoy, he was the son of Sir Jamsetjee Jejeebhoy, the fourth baronet.

References

1878 births
1931 deaths
Knights Commander of the Order of the Star of India
Indian knights
Businesspeople from Mumbai
Parsi people from Mumbai
Baronets in the Baronetage of the United Kingdom
Indian baronets
Members of the Central Legislative Assembly of India
Businesspeople in British India